Adam S. Veige is a professor of Chemistry at the University of Florida, his research focuses on the usage of inorganic compounds.

Education
Veige received a Ph.D. degree in chemistry from Cornell University in 2003 under the direction of Peter T. Wolczanski. He pursued postdoctoral research under the direction of Daniel G. Nocera at Massachusetts Institute of Technology.

Career
Veige joined the faculty of the University of Florida as an assistant professor of chemistry (inorganic chemistry) in 2004. In 2010, Veige received the Alfred P. Sloan fellowship award, the only researcher to be so honored in Florida in 2010. He was promoted to an associate professor in 2011. He is currently the director of the Center for Catalysis in the Department of Chemistry at the University of Florida.

His research focuses on the design, synthesis, isolation, and characterization of novel inorganic molecules for application in the production of fertilizers, polymers, and pharmaceuticals. His research has included the preparation of chiral catalysts, synthesis of nitriles via N-atom transfer to acid chlorides, chromium catalyzed aerobic oxidation, an alkene isomerization catalyst, a highly active alkene polymerization catalyst, and a highly active alkyne polymerization catalyst.

Awards
 Camille and Henry Dreyfus New Faculty Award (2004)
 National Science Foundation (NSF) Career Award (2008)
 Alfred P. Sloan Fellowship Award (2010)
 Heaton Family Faculty Award (2011)

Selected publications

References

External links 
Veige at the University of Florida Chemistry Department Website
University of Florida Chemistry Department Website

Living people
21st-century American chemists
Cornell University alumni
Year of birth missing (living people)